Federal Highway 123 (Carretera Federal 123) is a Federal Highway of Mexico. The highway travels entirely within the state of Veracruz from Orizaba in the north to Zongolica in the south.

References

123